Casimir Gide (4 July 1804 – 18 February 1868) was a 19th-century French composer, bookseller as well as prints and maps editor.

Biography
The son of the Parisian bookseller Theophile Etienne Gide (1768–1837), to whom he would succeed, and of a singer in the chapel of the king, he studied harmony and musical composition at the Conservatoire de Paris. On 4 February 1833, he received the bookseller patent from the Maison Gide fils. He was a major printer of lithographs and financed the publication of six volumes, among them nineteen of the Voyages pittoresques et romantiques dans l'ancienne France by Charles Nodier and Justin Taylor. In 1854, he was one of the first to launch the trend of salon operettas and artistic evenings.

Works
He wrote incidental music, ballets and operas.

Shows
1828: Les Trois Marie, vaudeville by Louis Duport, chant and accompagnement
1829: La Cachucha
1830: La Chatte blanche
1830: Les Trois Catherine, with Adolphe Adam
1830: Le Roi de Sicile, opéra comique in 1 act, with Frédéric Soulié
1831: Les Jumeaux de la Réole
1832: La tentation
1835: L'Île des pirates
1836: Le Diable boiteux, ballet pantomime in 3 acts, with Edmond Burat de Gurgy and Fanny Elssler
1838: La Volière ou les Oiseaux de Boccace
1839: La Tarentule, ballet-pantomime
1847: Ozaï, ballet pantomime in 2 acts, with Jean Coralli
 Pas redoublé pour harmonie militaire
 Romance (with Horace Gide)
1858: Belphegor

Piano music
 Quadrille et valse (piano) for Le Diable boiteux
 rondos-fantaisies on Ozaï
 Trois quadrilles de contredanses suivis de deux valses et un galop on La Tentation (with Fromental Halévy)

Libretti
1834: L'Angélus, opéra comique in 1 act (with Jean-Joseph Ader)
1845: Fragment d'un répétiteur de ballet
 Le Camélia, petite ronde pour piano sur une valse du ballet, Le Diable boiteux, Op. 102
 Le Muguet, petit rondo pour piano sur un air de danse du ballet, Le Diable boiteux
 La Tentation, opera in 5 acts, lyrics by Cavé, music by Halévy, ballets music by Gide

Lithographic prints
1845: Château de Dompierre
1845: Grande Salle de l'Hôtel de Ville de St Quentin
1845: Intérieur de l'Église de Notre Dame de Nesle
1857: Ancien Hôtel de Ville de Châlons-sur-Marne
1857: Ancienne Église St Nicaise à Reims
1857: Église d'Hermouville
1857: Église St Laurent à Nogent sur Seine
1857: Portail du Sud de l'Église de Mézières
1857: Portail méridional de l'Église de Réthel
1857: Vues d'une partie de l'Église de Bourgogne

Bibliography
 Dictionnaire universel des contemporains, 1865, Gustave Vapereau, (p. 744)
 Biographie universelle des musiciens, 1869, François-Joseph Fétis, (p. 3) 
 George Grove, John Alexander Fuller-Maitland, Grove's Dictionary of Music and Musicians, vol.2, 1906, (p. 273)
 René Dumesnil, La musique romantique française, 1944, (p. 140)
 Guide des genres de la musique occidentale, Eugène de Montalembert, Claude Abromont
 Frédéric Robert, La Musique française au XIXe siècle, 1970, (p. 41)
 Carl Dahlhaus, Sieghart Döhring, Pipers Enzyklopädie des Musiktheaters, 1997)
 Jean-Louis Tamvaco, Ivor Forbes Guest, Les cancans de l'Opéra, 2000, (p. 994)
 Jean-Jacques Velly, Le dessous des notes, 2001, (p. 73) 
 William E. Studwell, Minor Ballet Composers, 2012, (p. 43)

References

External links
 Buste de Casimir Gide sur Gallica

1804 births
1868 deaths
French ballet composers
French booksellers
French publishers (people)
French Romantic composers
Musicians from Paris